Paraplasmodium is a subgenus of the genus Plasmodium - all of which are parasitic eukaryotes. The subgenus was created by Telford in 1988. Species in this subgenus infect lizards.

Species 
Plasmodium chiricahuae
Plasmodium mexicanum
Plasmodium pifanoi

Description 
Species in the subgenus Paraplasmodium have the following characteristics:

The gametocytes are large.

The schizonts are medium size.

Exoerythrocytic schizonts may be produced in both fixed and wandering host cells.

Note:

One species (Plasmodium mexicanum) in this genus can undergo normal sporogony in a psychodid fly (Lutzomyia vexatrix).

References 

Plasmodium subgenera